The Beatles began in 1957, when John Lennon formed a skiffle group with his friends called the Quarrymen. The band underwent many name and membership changes, culminating in 1962 with the famous line-up of Lennon, Paul McCartney, George Harrison, and Ringo Starr. After the Beatles disbanded in 1970, each of the four members went on to have success, both as solo acts and with their own groups. Although Lennon died in 1980, the remaining Beatles re-united in 1994 to record new songs for the Anthology project. Since Harrison's death in 2001, the two remaining members have not reunited as the Beatles.

Pre-Beatles

John Lennon, Paul McCartney, George Harrison

Pete Best

Ringo Starr

The Beatles

Timeline

Post-Beatles

John Lennon

Paul McCartney

George Harrison

Ringo Starr

Pete Best

Stuart Sutcliffe

Notes

References
 
 
 

 
History of the Beatles
Beatles, The